Christianity is a minority religion in Burkina Faso. According to The World Factbook in 2019, Christians constitutes approximately 30% of the population, with Catholics representing 23.3% and Protestants 6.5%. According to official government estimates in 2008 the percentages are lower: 23.2% are Christians (19.0% being Roman Catholic, 4.2% being Protestant). The exact percentages might be hard to accurately predict due to a high degree of Syncretism that occurs in the country between Christians or Muslims and Traditional indigenous beliefs.

Representation in government
Although Christians are a minority of the overall population, they are over-represented in civil government. Presidents and heads of state of Burkina Faso who were Christians include Thomas Sankara, Saye Zerbo, Blaise Compaoré, Paul Kaba Thieba, and Roch Marc Christian Kaboré.

Present situation
Although interfaith relations between Muslims and Christians in Burkina Faso have historically been good, since 2015 there have been increasing attacks on Christians by Salafi jihadist in Burkina Faso, which have escalated rapidly since 2017. In April 2019 Islamist gunmen killed 5 Protestant worshipers and their pastor as they were leaving church after their service in the village of Silgadji near Mali. In May 2019 4 Catholics were killed by Islamist during a Marian procession in Zimtenga Department. In August 2019 4 Christians were executed by extremists in Bani Department for wearing crucifixes. On 1 December 2019 at least 14 church goers were killed in an attack when suspected Islamist gunmen opened fire on the church during services. On 17 February 2020 a group of gunmen attacked a Protestant church were service was being held in the village of Pansi, killing 24.

See also
Roman Catholicism in Burkina Faso
Religion in Burkina Faso

References

 
Religion in Burkina Faso